The 2010–11 Cayman Islands Premier League season was the 32nd season of top-tier football in the Cayman Islands. It began on 10 October 2010 and ended on 30 April 2011. Scholars International were the reigning champions, having won their 7th league title last season.

Teams
Sunset FC were relegated to the Cayman Islands First Division after finishing eighth place in last season's competition. Taking their place in the competition were the champions of the First Division, East End United.

Standings

Promotion/relegation playoff
The 7th place team in this competition, Tigers FC, faced the runners up of the First Division, Academy SC, for a place in next season's competition.

Results

Regular home games

Additional home games

Season statistics

Top goalscorers

Source: CIFA

Awards

CIFA Player of the Month

References

External links
Official Site
Soccerway

Cayman Islands Premier League seasons
1
Cayman